The Zbečník (also called Maternice or  Maternička) is a stream in the Hradec Králové Region of the Czech Republic. It is a tributary of the river Metuje in the town of Hronov. The length of the stream is 4.5 km and its greatest depth is about 60 cm. The stream bed is rocky and sandy and, in winter, the Zbečník freezes over. It flows through the Zbečník (or Maternice) Valley and through the village of Zbečník into the Metuje past several factories and companies in Hronov.

Skalákova Studánka (Skalák's Well) is source of the Zbečník, this place a tourist and religious spot located in the Maternice Valley, was an important source of drinking water in the past. Its water was considered active against cholera in the 19th century.

The village of Zbečník was founded over the valley of the Zbečník in the 14th or 15th century.

Gallery

References

External links
The basin area
slosar.cz Skalákova studánka

Rivers of the Hradec Králové Region